Disjecta: Miscellaneous Writings and a Dramatic Fragment is a collection of previously uncollected writings by Samuel Beckett, spanning his entire career. The title is derived from the Latin phrase "disjecta membra," meaning scattered remains or fragments, usually applied to written work. 
The essays appear in their original language of composition (English, French, or German), as stipulated by Beckett, since the volume is intended for scholars who should be able to read several languages. Beckett himself did not value these pieces much, seeing them as "mere products of friendly obligation or economic need".

The collection includes Beckett's famous essay on an early version of James Joyce's Finnegans Wake which originally appeared in Our Exagmination Round His Factification for Incamination of Work in Progress.

Contents
 Foreword by Ruby Cohn

Part I: Essays at Esthetics
 Dante...Bruno.Vico..Joyce – essay on Finnegans Wake
 Le Concentrisme – an account of an imaginary poet and the movement supposedly founded by him (French)
 Excerpts from Dream of Fair to Middling Women
 German Letter of 1937 (German)
 Les Deux Besoins (French)

Part II: Words about Writers
 Other Writers
 Mörike on Mozart
 Feuillerat on Proust
 Leishmann's Rilke translation
 Thomas McGreevy
 Recent Irish poetry
 Ezra Pound
 Papini on Dante
 Seán O'Casey
 Censorship in the Street
 Jack B. Yeats
 Denis Devlin
 McGreevy on Jack B. Yeats
 Self
 The Possessed
 On Murphy (to McGreevy)
 On Murphy (to Reavy)
 On Works to 1951
 On Endgame
 On Play
 On Murphy (to Sighle Kennedy)
 Program note for Endgame

Part III: Words about Painters
 Geer van Velde
 La Peinture des van Velde (French)
 Peintres de l'Empêchement (French)
 Three Dialogues
 Henri Hayden Homme-Peintre (French)
 Hommage à Jack B. Yeats (French)
 Henri Heyden
 Bram van Velde
 Pour Avigdor Arikha (French)

Part IV: Human Wishes

A One-Act fragment from an early historical play.

The play dramatized some episodes from the life of Samuel Johnson and takes its title from his long poem The Vanity of Human Wishes. The episodes taken dramatize Johnson's relationship with Hester Thrale, and as such, draw from her Anecdotes and Diaries rather than the traditionally more popular Life of Samuel Johnson of James Boswell. The play was abandoned after the completion of the First Act.

The only known extant fragment was given by Beckett to Ruby Cohn. Beckett left it in her Paris Hotel room shortly before the completion of her book of Beckett criticism, Just Play, the first to outline Beckett's dramatic juvenilia. The fragment was first printed as an appendix to that volume. The fragment was slightly annotated for the Disjecta collection, noting that Beckett produced a "fair copy" of the notebook material. The fragment, however, is only one of the "three full notebooks" that Beckett used while writing the play.

Beckett would reuse some of the dramatic effects, however. Critic Harold Bloom writes in his essay on Beckett in The Western Canon that the fragment, particular the characters' reactions to Leavett's entrance offer the first glimpses of Beckett's much later masterpieces Endgame and Waiting for Godot.

Notes

Books by Samuel Beckett
Essay collections